Eirik Wichne (born 12 May 1997) is a Norwegian professional footballer who plays for Sarpsborg, as a defender.

Personal life
He was born at Rikshospitalet as a part of quadruplets, all boys. They grew up in Mandal. His brothers Amund and Torje also became footballers.

Career statistics

References

1997 births
Living people
People from Mandal, Norway
Norwegian footballers
Mandalskameratene players
IK Start players
Eliteserien players
Norwegian First Division players
Association football defenders
Twin sportspeople
Norwegian twins
Quadruplets
Sarpsborg 08 FF players
Sportspeople from Agder